The Blanchardstown Centre is one of Ireland's largest shopping centres, located in Blanchardstown, Dublin, Ireland.  It opened in October 1996 and was extended in 2004 to create extra retail space.  It lies in the administration of Fingal County Council.

The Blanchardstown Centre is served by over 600 bus movements per day, and is close to Dublin's M50 radial motorway, and adjacent to the M3 motorway.

In June 2016 the centre was sold to the Blackstone Group by Green Property for an estimated €950m.

Stores
The centre contains over 180 stores, including banking outlets and dining facilities, three retail parks and 7,000 free car parking spaces. The anchor stores in the shopping centre itself include Dunnes, Penney's, and Marks and Spencer. A former anchor, Debenhams Ireland, was closed in April 2020, however Flannels has since replaced Debenhams, which is due to open in late 2022. Other tenants include H&M, Superdry Store, Vero Moda, Jack & Jones, River Island, JD, BT2 and Zara. The Blanchardstown Centre is also home to Ireland's largest TK Maxx store, Lifestyle Sports and 53 Degrees North, all of which are located in the "fashion park". Surrounding the centre are three retail parks, two of which are part of the centre, whilst the other, WestEnd Retail Park, is operated separately and features stores such as New Look, Argos, Lidl, Dealz, Nike Outlet, Heatons and Next. Harvey Norman, Smyths Toys, Currys PC World, Waltons Music, Elvery's Sports and DFS are also located in the retail parks around the centre.

The complex includes a 9-screen cinema operated by Odeon Cinemas and a Leisureplex entertainment centre.

Non-retail developments 
Other amenities located in or adjacent to the centre include the Draíocht arts centre, as well as Ireland's "largest purpose built public library".

At the time of building, the greater Blanchardstown area had a population of over 120,000. In the period that followed the 1996 opening of the retail spaces, additional commercial and office spaces were leased to eBay, Fingal County Council and Liberty Insurance - who relocated their headquarters to the site, bringing "over 1,300 staff to the area daily". The Crowne Plaza hotel chain also built a four-star 200-bedroom hotel within the development in 2008.

Plans
These plans included a three-storey complex with a new anchor store, 17 new shops and a food court located on the second floor, as well as a two-storey underground carpark. These plans proposed eight new restaurants for the exterior. As of January 2016, when the centre was put up for sale, these plans had not been executed. In June 2016, the centre was sold (together with this planning approval) to the Blackstone Group by Green Property for an estimated €950m.

References

External links
 

Shopping centres in County Dublin
Shopping malls established in 1996
Blanchardstown
Buildings and structures in Fingal